Magec may refer to:

Magec, Tenerife god
MAGEC2, protein
MAGEC, remote-controlled spinal rod